Methodius Terleckyj or Metodije Terlecki (died 1649) was the main supervisor of the Sacred Congregation for the Propagation of the Faith for publishing of the Slavic language liturgical books. Terleckyj was Ruthenian, i.e. Ukrainian from Belz Voivodeship and bishop of the Bishopric of Chelm (Orthodox bishopric which entered communion with the see of Rome).

Early life 
Before 1626 Terlecki became an Eastern Catholic priest of the Byzantine Rite. In 1626 he studied logic in Vienna and in 1627-28 he studied theology. In 1628 Josyf Veliamyn Rutsky appointed Terlecki as bishop of the Bishopric of Chelm and expected his return from Vienna to Chelm after he first travel to Rome to submit a report about Rusyn Greek-Catholic church.

Mission to convert Orthodox Serbs  
Terlecki participated in efforts to convert Orthodox Serbs in Croatia and Slavonia. Terlecki interested Josyf Veliamyn Rutsky in conversion of Orthodox Serbs of Slavonia and Croatia into Eastern Catholicism. Before he accepted appointment for this mission, Terlecki insisted that Rutsky should first give his approval. That is why Pope wrote to Rutsky and asked his permission for Terleckyj's mission, emphasizing that souls of 60,000 people would be saved in this mission.

In period between 1628 and 1644 Terlecki travelled many times to Slavonia and Croatia, actively working on the religious conversion of its Orthodox population under jurisdiction of the Bishopric of Marča. His activities were supported by Toma Hren, bishop of the Bishopric of Ljubljana. In 1628 Propaganda Fide sent him to visit Serbs living in the region of Žumberak. Upon his return Terlecki wrote a report which pleased the emperor and the Propaganda fide.

Based on the explicit instructions given directly by the Pope, Terlecki collaborated with Rafael Levaković.

References

Sources

Further reading 
  “O. Metodije Terlecki, Rusini i Marčanski uskoci”, Prilozi za književnost, jezik, istoriju i folklor Prilozi za književnost, jezik, istoriju i folklor, V., Beograd, 1925., 36.-37. , V., Beograd, 1925., 36.-37

Members of the Congregation for the Evangelization of Peoples
1649 deaths
Catholicisation